Banque Cantonale Vaudoise (BCV) is the cantonal bank of the Swiss Canton of Vaud. Headquartered in Lausanne, it is Vaud's biggest bank by balance sheet. BCV is a universal bank providing retail banking, corporate banking, wealth management, and trading services.

Activities of the BCV outside the canton of Vaud 
Unlike most Swiss cantonal banks, which operate primarily in the economic area of their home canton, BCV's field of activity extends far beyond their cantonal and national borders.

In the 1990s, several cantonal banks attempted to increase growth outside of their local and cantonal state borders. The expansion strategy of the BCV during this period with Greece and Hong Kong resulted in billions of dollars in losses. In the past, the Swiss taxpayer regularly paid for the damage incurred - even though a cantonal bank, as in the case of the BCV, never had a state guarantee.

In a BCV press release, published in 2011, it was stated that an office was to be opened in Zurich. With its presence in Zurich, BCV Asset Management is driving the expansion of its institutional business in the German-speaking part of Switzerland.

In an interview with the newspaper Le Temps on Sept. 15th 2015, the CEO of BCV, Pascal Kiener, stated with regard to the geographical activities of the bank that the expansion plans of the BCV would be limited to the neighboring countries of Switzerland. Another NZZ newspaper article reports that BCV acted as a lender to a Canadian-Turkish company in the Canadian province of Saskatchewan in that same year. In order to meet and speak with Alanna Koch, the former vice minister of agriculture, Banque Cantonale Vaudoise (BCV) invited Swiss journalists to Regina, Saskatchewans capital.

As part of the Swiss Bank Program of the US Department of Justice, DoJ, the BCV has reached an agreement. By paying a fine of US$41.7 million, the tax dispute between Switzerland and the United States has been settled in December 2015.

The director general of the Vaud Cantonal Bank (BCV), Stefan Bichsel, declared in an interview given in November 2016 on the portal Fundplatt.com that BCV has no longer any branch office abroad. The office in Zurich would be the only one outside of the canton of Vaud.

According to directory of the website thebanks.eu, which lists more than 8,000 European banks, the "Banque Cantonale Vaudoise Guernsey Branch" is a subsidiary of the Swiss Cantonal Bank BCV. Guernsey is also known as a tax haven.

The BCV’s involvement in the tax dispute with the USA 
Regarding the tax dispute between the Swiss banks and the US Department of Justice (DoJ) the Swiss banks are accused for having violated US laws by providing assistance for tax evasion. 78 banks out of the total of 106 Swiss banks escaped possible criminal proceedings through self-disclosure. The BCV is included within these 78 banks who pleaded guilty in the Category 2. Within this category alone, the penalties added up to more than US$1.36 billion, according to the US Department of Justice.

In order to avoid the risk of criminal proceedings against the BCV, BCV was forced to cooperate with the American judicial authorities. Therefore, the BCV had to transmit the names of approximately 200 employees to the US authorities.

Former BCV director, Gilbert Duchoud, convicted of embezzlement 
The Banque Cantonale Vaudoise, which had fallen into financial distress between 1996 and 2001, had to be saved from ruin due to bad loans and lack of reserves by the canton of Vaud. At the height of the crisis in 2002, the BCV had accumulated a loss of CHF 1.2 billion. In the years that followed, the canton of Vaud had to inject 2 billion Swiss francs to save the bank from financial ruin. The Chairman of the Board at that time, Gilbert Duchoud, was then dismissed by the State Council and compensated with 2 million for his premature departure.

As a result of the legalization of the debacle, it turned out that the BCV had been carrying out accounting manipulations since 1996, with the intention of hiding insufficient provisions. As can be seen from the prosecutors’ report of the investigation, the manipulations had been approved by Gilbert Duchoud personally.

In the lengthy process, all bank officers were acquitted of the allegations of balance sheet manipulation and document falsification. Only Gilbert Duchoud and Jacques Treyvaud were convicted of embezzlement in a minor point of the indictment.

Notes and references

See also 
 Cantonal bank
 List of banks in Guernsey
 List of banks in Europe
 List of Swiss companies by revenue

External links 
 

Vaud
Companies based in the canton of Vaud
Companies listed on the SIX Swiss Exchange
Swiss companies established in 1845
Banks established in 1845